Two vessels  of the Royal Navy have been named HMS Condor after the condor, the largest flying land birds in the Western Hemisphere.

 , a  launched in 1876 and sold in 1889. She took part in the bombardment of Alexandria during the 1882 Urabi Revolt in Egypt, while under the command of Lord Charles Beresford.
 , a  sloop launched in 1898 and lost off Cape Flattery on the North-West corner of the Continental United States during a storm in December 1901 whilst travelling from Esquimalt in Canada to Honolulu.

A former Royal Naval Air Station, HMS Condor at Arbroath, near Dundee became RM Condor in 1971.  It is the base for 45 Commando, Royal Marines.

References

Royal Navy ship names